The 1991 Utah Utes football team represented the University of Utah as a member of the Western Athletic Conference (WAC) during the 1991 NCAA Division I-A football season. In their second season under head coach Ron McBride, the Utes compiled an overall record of 7–5 record with a mark of 4–4 against conference opponents, placed fourth in the WAC, and were outscored by their opponents 277 to 276. The team played home games at Robert Rice Stadium in Salt Lake City.

Schedule

Roster

After the season

NFL Draft
One Utah layer was selected in the 1992 NFL Draft.

References

Utah
Utah Utes football seasons
Utah Utes football